Bevan David Hari (born 4 January 1975 in Rotorua) is a field hockey striker from New Zealand, who finished in sixth position with the Men's National Team, nicknamed Black Sticks, at the 2004 Summer Olympics in Athens, Greece.

References
 New Zealand Olympic Committee
 New Zealand Hockey Federation

External links
 

New Zealand male field hockey players
Male field hockey forwards
Field hockey players at the 1998 Commonwealth Games
1998 Men's Hockey World Cup players
Field hockey players at the 2002 Commonwealth Games
2002 Men's Hockey World Cup players
Field hockey players at the 2004 Summer Olympics
Field hockey players at the 2006 Commonwealth Games
2006 Men's Hockey World Cup players
Olympic field hockey players of New Zealand
Commonwealth Games silver medallists for New Zealand
1975 births
Living people
Sportspeople from Rotorua
Commonwealth Games medallists in field hockey
20th-century New Zealand people
21st-century New Zealand people
Medallists at the 2002 Commonwealth Games